Armatophallus is a genus of moths in the family Gelechiidae.

Species
 Armatophallus akagericus Bidzilya, 2015
 Armatophallus crudescens (Meyrick, 1920)
 Armatophallus exoenota (Meyrick, 1918)
 Armatophallus hackeri Bidzilya, 2015
 Armatophallus indicus Bidzilya, 2015
 Armatophallus kuehnei Bidzilya, 2015

References

 
Gelechiinae